Krzysztof Andrzej Hetman (born 27 June 1974) is a Polish politician who has served as a Member of the European Parliament since 2014. Born in Lublin, Hetman graduated from Maria Curie-Skłodowska University and soon after worked for Lublin Voivodeship as a deputy director from 2002 to 2005 and as a director of regional development from 2005 to 2007. In 2010, he was named Marshal of Lublin Voivodeship.

Hetman first ran for political office in 2006 when he ran for Lublin city council, but did not win. He also ran in the 2011 Polish parliamentary election as a member of the Polish People's Party. In 2014, he ran in the European Parliament elections in Lublin, and finished first with 24,862 votes.

References

External links
Krzysztof Hetman's European Parliament Page

1974 births
Living people
Politicians from Lublin
Polish People's Party politicians
Polish People's Party MEPs
MEPs for Poland 2014–2019
MEPs for Poland 2019–2024
Voivodeship marshals of Poland
Lublin Voivodeship